Lu Yangyang (born February 19, 1994), is a Chinese singer and actress based in China and South Korea. She was the leader and member of the South Korean girl group MIXX. As an actress, she is best known for her roles in the film Wish You Were Here (2019) and television series such as I Won't Get Bullied by Girls (2018), Gank Your Heart (2019), Chasing Love (2019), Whirlwind Magician (2021), Assistant of Superstar (2022) and Let's Meet Now (2022).

Early life
Lu was born on February 19, 1994, in Shandong, China. She graduated from Qilu Normal University.

Career

2016–2017: Debut with MIXX and disbandment
On May 3, 2016, Lu made her debut with MIXX with the first single "Oh Ma Mind". Lu made her acting debut in 2017 with the film Jun He Adventures.

2017–present: Acting debut and rising popularity
Lu starred in Narration Crisis which aired in July 2017. Lu made her small screen debut in the Youku romantic comedy television series I Won't Get Bullied by Girls alongside Cai Xukun. The series aired on April 12, 2018. She gained more recognition after starring in the film Wish You Were Here, which was released on April 12, 2019. Lu also played supporting roles in the television series Gank Your Heart, Chasing Love. In 2020, Lu starred in First Romance.

In 2021, Lu starred in My Handsome Roommate and the iQiyi's television series Whirlwind Magician. Lu was also the main female lead of Assistant of Superstar which was aired on February 14, 2022, on iQiyi. Her domestic popularity rose after starring in the romantic comedy Let's Meet Now which aired on iQiyi on September 9, 2022.

Discography

Singles

Filmography

Film

Television series

References

External links
 Lu Yangyang on Sina Weibo

1994 births
Living people
Chinese K-pop singers
Korean-language singers of China
Singers from Shandong
Chinese expatriates in South Korea
21st-century Chinese women singers
People from Shandong
Actresses from Shandong
21st-century Chinese actresses
Chinese television actresses
Chinese film actresses